Barnstable County is a county located in the U.S. state of Massachusetts. At the 2020 census, the population was 228,996. Its shire town is Barnstable. The county consists of Cape Cod and associated islands (some adjacent islands are in Dukes County and Nantucket County).

Barnstable County was formed as part of the Plymouth Colony on 2 June 1685, including the towns of Falmouth, Sandwich, and others lying to the east and north on Cape Cod.  Plymouth Colony was merged into the Province of Massachusetts Bay in 1691.

History

Giovanni da Verrazzano
Cape Cod is described in a letter from the Italian explorer Giovanni da Verrazzano to Francis I of France, relating the details of a voyage to the New World made on behalf of the French crown in the ship Dauphine, the only surviving of a fleet of four.  Sailing from Madeira in 1524, the Dauphine made land in North Carolina in March. It sailed north to Newfoundland, mapping the coast and interviewing the natives, whom he found friendly south of the cape, but unfriendly north of it. To the north of an island that reminded Verrazzano of Rhodes, the Dauphine made its way with difficulty over shoals "never less than three feet deep" extending "from the continent fifty leagues out to sea," which Brevoort, based on their extent, has identified as Nantucket Shoals. Verrazzano  called them Armellini. On the other side was a promontory, Pallavisino, which is probably the cape, as they sailed along it for "fifty leagues." Details of the north end are not given, but subsequently they came to a "high country, full of very dense forests, composed of pines," which, according to Brevoort and others, resembles the coast of Maine.

Bartholomew Gosnold
After Verrazzano, what is now the eastern United States acquired the map label of New France, but France had no way to develop it. Scattered colonies in the wilderness of a few dozen men could not be supported until the foundation of Quebec in 1608. Meanwhile, the paper claim did not deter entrepreneurs. In March, 1602, Bartholomew Gosnold set sail from Falmouth, Cornwall, in the ship, Concord, transporting a crew of eight, an exploration party of 12, and 20 colonists, with the intent of establishing a trading post in the New World. Intersecting the coast of Maine, they turned to the south, encountered what appeared to be an island, and dropped anchor in Provincetown Harbor. Gosnold at first called the land Shoal Hope, but after discovering it was a cape, and acquiring a hold full of cod from the abundant schools in Cape Cod Bay, he changed the name to Cape Cod.

Gosnold explored the cape, establishing good relations with the natives there, approximately 1500 members of the Nauset Tribe, closely related in language and custom to the Wampanoag people of the mainland, and under their sovereignty. John Brereton, chaplain of the expedition, reported that they were dark-skinned, customarily nude except for deerskins over the shoulders and sealskins around the waist, and wore their long, black hair up in a knot. They painted their bodies. Some knew a few English words, which is something of a historical problem, as Gosnold and his companions are believed to have been the first English to land in America. Gosnold made a point of describing how healthy the people appeared.

Subsequently, Gosnold sailed around the cape to discover an island, "full of wood, vines, gooseberry bushes, whortleberries, raspberries, eglantines, etc.," as well as large numbers of shore birds. He named it Martha's Vineyard after his daughter. Another island nearby, Cuttyhunk Island, he named Elizabeth Island, in honor of Elizabeth I of England, from which the Elizabeth Islands take their name. He intended to place a trading post there, but when the time came for the return voyage, the colonists decided not to remain. Gosnold ventured a second time to the New World in 1608 as Captain John Smith's second in command of the Jamestown expedition. After three months there, he died of malaria.

Martin Pring
In 1603, another mercantile expedition set sail from Bristol, England, in two ships, the Speedwell and the Discoverer, commanded by a 23-year-old captain, Martin Pring. Elizabeth I had died two weeks earlier, but Pring had secured permission from Sir Walter Raleigh, who held from the queen exploration rights to all of North America.

Geography
It is the second-largest county in Massachusetts by total area.

Barnstable County is not co-extensive with Cape Cod. The latter is a geophysical term defined by its insular or peninsular landmass. Originally, he points out, only the tip was considered the cape, but as it was settled the name extended from its tip to the shortest line across the isthmus. Barnstable County, on the other hand, is a geopolitical and legal term. It is the area contained within the borders of all cities and towns defined to be in the county by the Massachusetts General Court. These borders were located in multiple episodes of disputed legislation during the centuries since the foundation of Plymouth Colony.

The main difference between Cape Cod and Barnstable County is the band of water up to several miles wide extending from the shoreline to the outermost county border. The offshore area contains significant maritime life, as well as being a recreational and transportational medium, and containing historical material lost with sunken ships.

The lowest point is sea level.

Adjacent counties
Barnstable County borders Plymouth County to the northwest; off Barnstable County's southern shore are Dukes County and Nantucket County.

National protected areas
 Cape Cod National Seashore
 Mashpee National Wildlife Refuge
 Monomoy National Wildlife Refuge

Demographics

2000 census
As of the census of 2000, there were 222,230 people, 94,822 households, and 61,065 families residing in the county.  The population density was 562 people per square mile (217/km2).  There were 147,083 housing units at an average density of 372 per square mile (144/km2).  The racial makeup of the county was 94.23% White, 1.79% Black or African American, 0.56% Native American, 0.63% Asian, 0.02% Pacific Islander, 1.11% from other races, and 1.66% from two or more races.  1.35% of the population were Hispanic or Latino of any race. 24.0% were of Irish, 15.6% English, 9.4% Italian, 5.9% German and 5.0% "American" ancestry, 93.6% spoke English, 1.7% Portuguese, 1.4% Spanish and 1.0% French as their first language.

There were 94,822 households, out of which 24.30% had children under the age of 18 living with them, 52.20% were married couples living together, 9.40% had a female householder with no husband present, and 35.60% were non-families. 29.50% of all households were made up of individuals, and 14.40% had someone living alone who was 65 years of age or older.  The average household size was 2.28 and the average family size was 2.82.

In the county, the population was spread out, with 20.40% under the age of 18, 5.20% from 18 to 24, 25.00% from 25 to 44, 26.20% from 45 to 64, and 23.10% who were 65 years of age or older. The median age was 45 years. For every 100 females, there were 89.90 males.  For every 100 females age 18 and over, there were 86.10 males.

The median income for a household in the county was $45,933, and the median income for a family was $54,728. Males had a median income of $41,033 versus $30,079 for females. The per capita income for the county was $25,318.  About 4.60% of families and 6.90% of the population were below the poverty line, including 8.60% of those under age 18 and 5.00% of those age 65 or over.

2010 census
As of the 2010 United States census, there were 215,888 people, 95,755 households, and 58,724 families residing in the county. The racial makeup of the county was 92.7% white, 1.9% black or African American, 1.1% Asian, 0.6% American Indian, 1.5% from other races, and 2.2% from two or more races. Those of Hispanic or Latino origin made up 2.2% of the population. In terms of ancestry, 27.0% were Irish, 19.2% were English, 11.4% were Italian, 11.4% were American, and 9.1% were German.

Of the 95,755 households, 22.2% had children under the age of 18 living with them, 48.3% were married couples living together, 9.6% had a female householder with no husband present, 38.7% were non-families, and 31.8% of all households were made up of individuals. The average household size was 2.21 and the average family size was 2.77. The median age was 49.9 years.

The median income for a household in the county was $60,317 and the median income for a family was $75,056. Males had a median income of $53,480 versus $41,990 for females. The per capita income for the county was $35,246. About 5.0% of families and 7.2% of the population were below the poverty line, including 9.8% of those under age 18 and 5.6% of those age 65 or over.

Demographic breakdown by town

Income

The ranking of unincorporated communities that are included on the list are reflective if the census designated locations and villages were included as cities or towns. Data is from the 2007-2011 American Community Survey 5-Year Estimates.

Politics
Until the 1990s, Barnstable County was a stronghold of the Republican Party. It has since come to favor the Democratic Party, supporting Democratic candidates in all presidential elections since 1992.

|}

Government

Barnstable County is one of the last functioning counties in Massachusetts. County government consists of a legislative branch (Barnstable County Assembly of Delegates) and an executive branch (Barnstable County Commissioners).

Barnstable County Assembly of Delegates
The Assembly of Delegates is the legislative branch of Barnstable County. There are 15 towns located within Barnstable County, with each town represented on the Assembly. In 1989, by an Act of the Massachusetts General Court and confirmed by a majority of Barnstable County voters, the Barnstable County Home Rule Charter went into effect and the first session of the Assembly of Delegates convened. All legislative powers of the County are vested in the Assembly, which acts by ordinance and also adopts resolutions.

The Assembly of Delegates consists of 15 delegates, one representing each of the towns located in Barnstable County.  A delegate's vote is weighted based on the population of his or her town. The town of Barnstable, for example, has the largest share of the vote, at 20.92%, and Truro has the smallest, at 0.93%.

Barnstable County Commissioners
There are three Barnstable County Commissioners who together act as the Executive Branch of county government. Each commissioner is elected at large and serves a  four-year staggered term. Duties of the commissioners include direction of county agencies, preparation of budgets for submission to the Assembly, care of county property and finances, proposing ordinances to the Assembly, and appointment of the County Administrator.

Ronald Bergstrom (D-Chatham), Chair
Term: 2019–2023

Sheila Lyons (D-Wellfleet), Vice-Chair
Term: 2021–2025

Mark Forest (D-Yarmouth), Commissioner
Term: 2021–2025

Cape Cod Commission
The planning agency of Barnstable County is the Cape Cod Commission.

Communities
Cities and towns have been legally incorporated as such under the laws of the State of Massachusetts. They include the entire territory of the state. A city may continue to name itself a town even though legally a city. Villages are subordinate to cities or towns. In addition to and not necessarily based on these legal municipalities are the arbitrary divisions of the United States Census Bureau. Villages are census divisions which may be used as special purpose municipalities or may have a greater sense of civic identity than their constituent town(s), but are not fully functioning municipal corporations. For example, the City of Barnstable has five fire districts that cover the seven villages - each village has its own fire department except that Centerville, Osterville and Marstons Mills have combined their efforts into the COMM Fire Department.

City
Barnstable (county seat)

Towns

Bourne
Brewster
Chatham
Dennis
Eastham
Falmouth
Harwich
Mashpee
Orleans
Provincetown
Sandwich
Truro
Wellfleet
Yarmouth

Villages

Barnstable
Centerville
Cotuit
Craigville
Hyannis
Hyannis Port
Marstons Mills
North Harwich
North Truro
Osterville
Pleasant Lake
South Harwich
West Barnstable
West Harwich
Monument Beach
Pocasset
Sagamore
Sagamore Beach
Cataumet
Buzzards Bay

Census-designated places

Bourne
Brewster
Buzzards Bay
Chatham
Dennis
Dennis Port
East Dennis
East Falmouth
East Harwich
East Sandwich
Falmouth
Forestdale
Harwich Center
Harwich Port
Mashpee Neck
Monomoscoy Island
Monument Beach
New Seabury
North Eastham
North Falmouth
Northwest Harwich
Orleans
Pocasset
Popponesset
Popponesset Island
Provincetown
Sagamore
Sandwich
Seabrook
Seconsett Island
South Dennis
South Yarmouth
Teaticket
West Chatham
West Dennis
West Falmouth
West Yarmouth
Woods Hole
Yarmouth Port

Unincorporated communities

Bellingsgate
Captains Hill
Captains Village
Ferris Fields
Hatchville
Long Point
Monomoy Island
South Brewster
South Chatham
South Sandwich
Waquoit
Wood End

Education
School districts include:

Officially K-12:
 Barnstable School District
 Bourne School District
 Dennis-Yarmouth School District
 Falmouth School District
 Mashpee School District
 Monomoy Regional School District
 Provincetown School District - While it is designated as a K-12 district, Provincetown High School ended operations after 2013.
 Sandwich School District

Secondary:
 Nauset School District

Elementary:
 Brewster School District
 Eastham School District
 Orleans School District
 Truro School District
 Wellfleet School District

Truro residents are eligible to go to Nauset Regional High School, and formerly to Provincetown High.

Cape Cod Community College is in the county.

Economy
The county is known for aquaculture. It ranks first in the state for revenue from aquaculture products.

See also

List of counties in Massachusetts
 List of Massachusetts locations by per capita income
 Barnstable County Correctional Facility
 Barnstable County Courthouse
 Barnstable County Hospital
 Barnstable Municipal Airport
 Cape Cod
 Cape Cod Commission
 Joint Base Cape Cod
 Nantucket Sound
 National Register of Historic Places listings in Barnstable County, Massachusetts
 Registry of Deeds (Massachusetts)
 Scusset Beach State Reservation
 Shawme-Crowell State Forest

Citations

General bibliography

External links

 
 Barnstable County Registry of Deeds
 Cape Cod Commission official site
  USGenWeb Genealogical Site for Barnstable County
 OASIS Online Archival Search Information System; Barnstable County

 
1685 establishments in Massachusetts
Counties of Plymouth Colony
Massachusetts counties
Populated places established in 1685